Chen Xirong (born 1953 in Guangzhou) is a former Chinese international football player and coach as well as also being a media pundit. As a player, he would play for Guangdong FC where he won the club's first ever Chinese league title in 1979, while internationally he represented China in the 1976 Asian Cup and in the 1980 Asian Cup. After retiring, he would move into management where he joined Guangdong FC's cantonese rival Guangzhou FC before becoming a media pundit for Guangdong sports channel.

Career statistics

International statistics

Honours

Player
Guangdong FC
China national league: 1979

References

External links
Team China Stats
Player profile at Sodasoccer

1953 births
Living people
Footballers from Guangzhou
Chinese footballers
China international footballers
1976 AFC Asian Cup players
1980 AFC Asian Cup players
Chinese football managers
Guangdong Winnerway F.C. players
Guangzhou F.C. managers
Chinese association football commentators
Association football midfielders
China national football team managers